The Center for Family and Human Rights (C-Fam) is a right-wing United States-based advocacy group, founded in 1997, in order to affect policy debate at the United Nations and other international institutions. It was formerly known as the Catholic Family and Human Rights Institute. The 501(c)(3) organization is anti-abortion and anti-LGBT.

History

The Catholic Family & Human Rights Institute was formally incorporated on 11 August 1997 in Suffolk County, NY with three directors - Seth Perlman, Clifford Perlman and Jane Burke-Robertson  Initially nicknamed CAFHRI, the group was founded as an independent non-profit corporation by Human Life International-Canada and then with ongoing support from the headquarters of Human Life International (HLI), based in Front Royal, Virginia. Later nicknamed C-Fam, which subsequently became the group's corporate name, part of the group's mission was to work closely with the Holy See delegation at the UN. Austin Ruse subsequently replaced Anne Noonan as Director and shortly thereafter became president.

In July 2013, Ruse was identified as a key member of Groundswell, a coalition of conservative activists and journalists attempting to make political change within the United States from behind the scenes. Ruse is also the author of two books; Fake Science: Exposing the Left's Skewed Statistics, Fuzzy Facts, and Dodgy Data, published by Regnery, and Littlest Suffering Souls: Children Whose Short Lives Point Us to Christ, published by TAN Books.

In 2015, Monsignor Anthony Frontiero resigned from the organization's board of directors in protest when Ruse commented "The hard-left human-hating people that run modern universities should be taken out and shot." Ruse said this was a figure of speech and issued a formal apology.

NGO at the United Nations 

In February, 2014, the 19-member NGO Committee of the United Nations Economic and Social Council (ECOSOC) unanimously approved C-Fam for Special Consultative Status. On April 23, 2014, the ECOSOC granted this status without objection.

Jessica Stern of the LGBT rights advocacy group OutRight Action International, commenting on C-FAM's United Nations mission, said that the organization "regularly releases homophobic vitriol". The civil rights advocacy organization Southern Poverty Law Center (SPLC) has listed C-Fam as an anti-LGBT hate group, and pointed out that Ruse supports the criminalization of homosexuality.

In 2015, Stefano Gennarini (Director of the Centre for Legal Studies at C-Fam) publicly criticised Bishop Marcelo Sánchez Sorondo, chancellor of the Pontifical Academy of Social Sciences and the Pontifical Academy of Sciences in the Vatican, by accusing him of opposing the negotiating position of the Holy See on the issue of sexual and reproductive health. He also went on to accuse economist Jeffrey Sachs, director of the Earth Institute at Columbia University and a senior UN advisor, and UN Secretary-General Ban Ki-moon of actively promoting abortion. This received a strong rebuke from Professor Margaret Archer of the University of Warwick, president of the Pontifical Academy of Social Sciences, who referred to "distorted criticism" and raised concern at Gennarini's "understanding of Catholic Social Doctrine”. This, in turn, drew a rebuke from influential Catholic journalist Phil Lawler who wrote, "Archer’s ad hominem approach, and her unwillingness to engage the real issues in the debate, were unworthy of a social scientist. Her uncharitable attitude is unworthy of someone representing the Holy See."

The London-based Guardian newspaper reported in May 2019 that C-Fam has "emerged from the extreme right fringe on abortion, sexual orientation and gender identity to become a powerful player behind the scenes at the UN. With a modest budget and a six-strong staff led by the president Austin Ruse, it has leveraged connections inside the Trump administration to enforce a rigid orthodoxy on social issues, and helped build a new US coalition with mostly autocratic regimes that share a similar outlook." Subsequently, Reuters wrote, "Emails and memos from U.S. officials at the U.N. obtained by Reuters show the influence of the Center for Family and Human Rights, or C-Fam, a private U.S. research institute formed to affect policy at the U.N. to align with conservative Catholic views." The SPLC has characterized the institute as being "heavily focused on global anti-LGBT work", citing its opposition to United Nations efforts to protect LGBT rights and to study and prevent anti-LGBT violence, and praise of American anti-gay activist Scott Lively.

Staff
Besides Ruse, who is the president of the organization, C-FAM lists four staff members:
Lisa Correnti, Executive Vice President
Stefano Gennarini, Vice President for the Center of Legal Studies
Rebecca Oas, Director of Research
Hannah Russo, Development Manager

See also
 List of organizations with consultative status to the United Nations Economic and Social Council
 List of organizations designated by the Southern Poverty Law Center as anti-LGBT hate groups

References

External links

501(c)(3) organizations
Anti-abortion organizations in the United States
Christian organizations based in the United States
Christian organizations established in 1997
Christianity in New York City
Christianity in Washington, D.C.
Conservative political advocacy groups in the United States
Foreign policy and strategy think tanks in the United States
Human rights organizations based in the United States
Legal think tanks
Non-profit organizations based in New York City
Non-profit organizations based in Washington, D.C.
Organizations that oppose LGBT rights in the United States
Political and economic think tanks in the United States
Research institutes established in 1997
Research institutes in New York (state)
Think tanks based in Washington, D.C.
Think tanks established in 1997
1997 establishments in the United States